These are the Canadian number-one albums of 2019. The chart is compiled by Nielsen SoundScan and published in Billboard magazine as Top Canadian Albums.

Number-one albums

See also
List of Canadian Hot 100 number-one singles of 2019
List of number-one digital songs of 2019 (Canada)

References

External links
 Billboard Top Canadian Albums

2019
Canada Albums
2019 in Canadian music